No.7 Cherry Lane is a 2019 Hong Kong-Chinese adult animated film directed by Yonfan, with animation by Zhang Gang.  It was selected to compete for the Golden Lion at the 76th Venice International Film Festival.  It was also selected for the 2019 Toronto International Film Festival as a Special Presentation. At the Venice Film Festival, the film won the Best Screenplay Award.

Plot
During the rise of the materialistic comfort of life in the 1960s, there emerges an undercurrent of danger in Hong Kong.

No.7 Cherry Lane tells the tale of Ziming, a Hong Kong University undergraduate, entangled between his amorous feelings for a self-exiled mother Mrs Yu from Taiwan in the White Terror period, and her beautiful daughter Meiling.  He takes them to different movies and through a series of magical moments on the big screen, forbidden passions are revealed.  And the era coincides with Hong Kong's turbulent times of 1967.

Voice cast
 Sylvia Chang as Mrs Yu:  Once an idealistic revolutionary student during the Sino-Japanese War and now a luxury goods merchandiser she struggles between spiritualism and materialism.  In her early 40s, Mrs Yu retains her old-world charm.  She is divorced and has an 18-year-old daughter. 
 Zhao Wei as Meiling:  Daughter of Mrs Yu.  The world seems to revolve around this sweet and tender 18-year-old girl.  She is beautiful, wilful and invincible.  She knows everything she’s entitled to and takes no less.  She also knows tomorrow belongs to her. 
 Alex Lam as Ziming:  A top English literature student at Hong Kong University.  He plays tennis, loves movies, goes to parties and makes extra money by giving English tuition.  He has a certain magical charm for women, men and animals.  And he is comfortable with all of them.  
 Kelly Yao as Mrs May:  A retired opera diva who lives a floor above Mrs Yu.  She devotes herself to religion and loves cats and good-looking men.
 Natalia Duplessis as Madame Simone:  A big French movie star who liberates Mrs Yu through her three vintage films.
 Teresa Cheung as Miaoyu the Nun:  A Taoist nun from the book Dream of the Red Chamber who liberates Mrs Yu in her dream.
 Jiang Wenli as The Woman in Yellow
 Daniel Wu as Baron Louis
 Stephen Fung as Steven
 Tian Zhuangzhuang as Ah Kwok
 Ann Hui as The Pickpocket
 Fruit Chan as The Craven Cat
 Rebecca Pan as Mrs Lin

References

External links
 Official Website
 

2019 films
2019 animated films
Hong Kong animated films
Chinese animated films
2010s Cantonese-language films
Films directed by Yonfan
2010s Mandarin-language films
2010s Hong Kong films